James Apostle Fields (August, 1844 – November 23, 1903) was a prominent lawyer and member of the Virginia House of Delegates in 1879 and 1889. He was born in slavery in Hanover County, Virginia in 1844 to Washington Fields and Martha Ann Berkley. He escaped slavery in early 1864, and was among the first students at the Hampton Normal and Agricultural Institute. He first joined the House of Delegates for the 1879–80 term, and then received a law degree from Howard University in 1882. He was elected again to the House of Delegates for 1889–90, and did not seek reelection. He taught students for 14 years, becoming a school superintendent in 1890. He also farmed and maintained a law practice. In 1903, he died of Bright's Disease.

The James A. Fields House in Newport News, Virginia is included on the National Register of Historic Places. Virginia has approved a historical highway marker slated for Hanover County for the Fields family. James' brother was George Washington Fields, a lawyer who also was a member of the House of Delegates. His niece Inez C. Fields was the third black woman to practice law in Virginia.

See also 
 List of first minority male lawyers and judges in Virginia
 African-American officeholders during and following the Reconstruction era

References 

Republican Party members of the Virginia House of Delegates
1844 births
1903 deaths
19th-century American politicians
Hampton University alumni
Howard University alumni
African-American politicians during the Reconstruction Era
Politicians from Newport News, Virginia
19th-century American lawyers
African-American lawyers
Virginia lawyers
20th-century African-American people